Itay Margalit (born 25 January 1970) is a retired Israeli high jumper.

He finished ninth at the 1998 European Indoor Championships. He also competed at the 1990 European Championships, the 1993 World Championships, the 1994 European Championships, the 1997 World Indoor Championships and the 1998 European Championships without reaching the final.

His personal best jump is 2.27 metres, achieved in June 1998 in Tel Aviv.

References

1970 births
Living people
Israeli male high jumpers